The Peach Bowl is an annual college football bowl game played in Atlanta, Georgia, since December 1968. Since 1997, it has been sponsored by Chick-fil-A and is officially known as the Chick-fil-A Peach Bowl. From 2006 to 2013, it was officially referred to as simply the Chick-fil-A Bowl. The winner of the bowl game is awarded the George P. Crumbley Trophy, named after the game's founder George Crumbley.

The first three Peach Bowls were played at Grant Field on the Georgia Tech campus in Atlanta. Between 1971 and 1992, Atlanta–Fulton County Stadium hosted the game. Between 1993 and 2016, the Georgia Dome played host. The bowl then moved to Mercedes-Benz Stadium starting in 2017. Since the 2014 season, the Peach Bowl has been part of the New Year's Six, featuring College Football Playoff matchups with the 2016, 2019, 2022, and 2025 games hosting a national semifinal.

History
Seven of the first ten meetings (all but the 1968, 1971, and 1974 games) pitted an Atlantic Coast Conference team against an at-large opponent.  The bowl had no automatic berths prior to 1993, but usually featured an ACC team or a team from the Southeastern Conference.  From 1993 until 2013, the game matched an SEC team against one from the ACC.  From 1993 to 2005, this matchup was the third selection from the ACC against the fourth from the SEC. In 2005, the bowl hosted its first-ever matchup of top 10 ranked teams.

The Peach Bowl was the first charity bowl, and is credited to being created by Lions Club member George Pierre Crumbley Jr., known as the "Father of the Peach Bowl", who shepherded it through NCAA certification. The game was originally created as a fund-raiser by the Lions Clubs of Georgia in 1968, but after years of lackluster attendance and revenue, the game was taken over by the Atlanta Chamber of Commerce.

Chick-fil-A, a fast food restaurant chain based in nearby College Park, has sponsored the game since 1997.  From 2006 until 2013, Chick-fil-A's contract gave it full naming rights and the game was referred to as the Chick-fil-A Bowl as a result. The traditional "Peach Bowl" name was reinstated following the announcement that the bowl would be one of the six College Football Playoff bowls.

The funds from the deal were used to increase payouts for the participating teams. In response, from 2006 to 2014 the ACC gave the committee the first pick of its teams after the BCS—usually the loser of the ACC Championship Game or one of the division runners-up.  Also from 2006, the bowl got the fifth overall selection from the SEC (including the BCS). However, the BCS took two SEC schools in every season for the last nine years of its run, leaving the Chick-Fil-A with the sixth pick from the conference—usually one of the division runners-up. It ascended to major-bowl status when it was added to the "New Year's Six" bowls starting with the 2014 season, assuring that it would feature major conference champions and/or prestigious runners-up.

As of 2013, the bowl was sold out for 17 straight years, the second-longest streak behind only the Rose Bowl Game. In 2007, the Chick-fil-A Bowl became the best-attended non-BCS bowl for the previous decade.

The 2007 game was played on December 31, 2007, featuring the second Peach Bowl matchup between #15 Clemson and #21 Auburn.  It was the first time the Peach Bowl had ended regulation play with a tie, and with the rules in play since the early 1990s, required an overtime, which Auburn won, 23–20. With a 5.09 share (4.92 million households), the 2007 game was the highest-rated ESPN-broadcast bowl game of the 2007–2008 season as well as the highest rated in the game's history. The rating was also higher than two New Year's Day bowls, the Cotton and the Gator. In October 2009, the bowl extended the Atlantic Coast Conference contract through 2013.  According to Sports Illustrated, although the bowl generated $12.3 million in profit in 2007, only $5.9 million of that was paid out to the participating schools. On December 31, 2012, the bowl set new records for viewership. The New Year's Eve telecast – a 25-24 Clemson victory over LSU – averaged 8.557 million viewers (a 5.6 household coverage rating), making it ESPN's most-viewed non-BCS bowl ever.

The 2017 season matchup, played January 1, 2018, featured an undefeated UCF playing an Auburn team that had in the regular season defeated both National Championship contenders Georgia and Alabama (the eventual 2017 College Football Playoffs Champion). A 34–27 UCF victory resulted in UCF being the only undefeated FBS team for the 2017 season. As such, UCF was selected as the 2017 National Champions by one NCAA recognized selector and thus claims a share of the 2017 National Championship.

The Peach Bowl has donated more than $32 million to charity since 2016.

Statistics
 Ninth-oldest bowl game in college football history.
 A then-Georgia Dome attendance record of 75,406 set in 2006 (Georgia vs. Virginia Tech).
 17 straight sellouts (1998–2013).
 Highest-attended non-BCS bowl game.
 More than $125 million in cumulative payout (through the 2013 season).

Game results
All rankings are based on the AP Poll prior to the game being played. Italics denote a tie game.

Source:
 Denotes College Football Playoff semifinal game

Future games

 denotes game is a College Football Playoff semifinal

MVPs
An offensive and defensive MVP are selected for each game; from 1989 through 1998, selections were made for both teams.

Most appearances
Updated through the December 2022 edition (55 games, 110 total appearances).

Teams with multiple appearances

Teams with a single appearance
Won (11): Alabama, Arizona State, Army, Baylor, East Carolina, Houston, Michigan State, Syracuse, TCU, Texas A&M, UCF

Lost (9): Cincinnati, Duke, Illinois, Iowa State, Michigan, Ohio State, Oklahoma, Pittsburgh, Washington

Tied (2): Texas Tech, Vanderbilt

Appearances by conference
Updated through the December 2022 edition (55 games, 110 total appearances).

 Games marked with an asterisk (*) were played in January of the following calendar year.
 Records are based on a team's conference affiliation at the time the game was played.
 Conferences that are defunct or no longer active in FBS are marked in italics.
SWC and Big Eight appearances were prior to the 1996 merger of four Southwest Conference schools and eight Big Eight schools, which created the Big 12.
The WAC no longer sponsors FBS football.
 Independent appearances: Army (1985), East Carolina (1991*), Florida State (1968, 1983), Georgia Tech (1971, 1978), Miami (FL) (1980*), Syracuse (1989), Virginia Tech (1980*, 1986), West Virginia (1969, 1972, 1975, 1981)
 The game following the 1980 season, played in January 1981, was contested between two independent programs.

Game records

Source:

Battle for Bowl Week
Battle for Bowl Week has the teams compete in events during the week leading up to the game. Events in 2021 included a basketball challenge and go-kart racing. From 2011 to 2021, the winner of the Battle for Bowl Week won the game six of ten times.

See also

List of college bowl games
List of Peach Bowl broadcasters

References

External links
 

 
College football bowls
American football competitions in Atlanta
Annual sporting events in the United States
Tourist attractions in Atlanta
1968 establishments in Georgia (U.S. state)
Recurring sporting events established in 1986